Jerome S. Moss (born May 8, 1935) is an American recording executive, best known for being the co-founder of A&M Records, along with trumpet player and bandleader Herb Alpert.

Music career 
After graduating from Brooklyn College with a degree in English and serving in the United States Army, Moss began his music career by promoting "16 Candles", a 1958 hit for the Crests on Coed Records. In 1960 he moved to California, where he teamed up with Alpert, forming Carnival Records in 1962 and running the company from an office in Alpert's garage. Discovering that the name was already taken, they dubbed their new-found company A&M Records.

Moss and Alpert agreed in 1987 to sell A&M to PolyGram Records for a reported $500 million. Both continued to manage the label until 1993, when they left because of frustrations with PolyGram's constant pressure to force the label to fit into its corporate culture. In 1998, Alpert and Moss sued PolyGram for breach of the integrity clause, eventually settling for an additional $200 million payment. Alpert and Moss then expanded their Almo Sounds music publishing company to produce records as well, using it as a vehicle for Alpert's music. Almo Sounds imitates the former company culture embraced by Alpert and Moss when they first started A&M.

Moss, Herb Alpert and Herb's cousin Steve Alpert were inducted into the Rock and Roll Hall of Fame in 2006 as non-performers.

Horse racing 
In 2004, Moss was appointed to the California Horse Racing Board, replacing longtime television producer Alan Landsburg. He is a longtime horse-breeder and owner who received the largest ever first-place purse from the Kentucky Derby in 2005 after the victory of the first horse he had ever entered in that race, Giacomo. In 2011, he was inducted into the Southern California Jewish Sports Hall of Fame.

Personal life
Jerry Moss married Tina (Morse) Moss in 2019, after dating since 2016. They live in Bel Air, California, and Maui, Hawaii.

Philanthropy 
In 2020, Jerry and his wife Tina donated $25,000,000 to The Music Center in downtown Los Angeles. This was the largest single contribution ever made to The Music Center.

References

External links

1935 births
Living people
Brooklyn College alumni
A&M Records
American music industry executives
Record producers from New York (state)
Grammy Award winners
American racehorse owners and breeders
Owners of Kentucky Derby winners
Owners of a Breeders' Cup winner